The United States's Cresset nuclear test series was a group of 22 nuclear tests conducted in 1977–1978. These tests  followed the Operation Fulcrum series and preceded the Operation Quicksilver series.

References

Explosions in 1977
Explosions in 1978
1977 in military history
1978 in military history
Cresset